Susy Vaterlaus (born 26 July 1932) is a Swiss former freestyle swimmer. She competed in the women's 100 metre freestyle at the 1952 Summer Olympics.

References

External links
 

1932 births
Living people
Olympic swimmers of Switzerland
Swimmers at the 1952 Summer Olympics
Place of birth missing (living people)
Swiss female freestyle swimmers
20th-century Swiss women